Palaw Township is a township of Myeik District in the Taninthayi Region of Burma (Myanmar). The principal town and administrative seat is Palaw.  Second in importance is the town of Palauk.

Administrative subdivisions
Palaw Township is divided into twenty-seven tracts. Six of those tracts are organized into the Palauk Subtownship which occupies the northern third of the township, and which is administered from the town of Palauk.

Communities
Among the villages in Palaw Township are: Banka, Bodaungseik, Kade, Kataungni, Mintein, Palawgong (Palawgon), Pidat, Tonbu, Wachaung, and Zadiwin.

There are a 50-bed township hospital, five 16-bed station hospitals at Pala, Palauk, Maligyun, Pyinbugyi and Kyaukka, one maternal and child health care centre, one urban health care centre, six rural health centers and 15 sub rural health care centers in 2011.

References

Townships of Taninthayi Region